Callizzia amorata, the gray scoopwing moth, is a species of swallowtail moth of the  family Uraniidae and is found in North America.

Description

Adults
Adult forewings are typically held horizontally and spread, while the hindwings are creased and held along or over the abdomen.  The forewings each have a black-edged, brown triangle near the outer margin.

Range
The species' occurrence range extends from California and British Columbia in the west to Florida and Nova Scotia in the east.

Life cycle

Adults
Adults have been reported from February to October, with most sightings from May to August.

References

Moths described in 1876
Uraniidae